HD 72945 and HD 72946 form a co-moving star system in the northern constellation of Cancer. HD 72945 is a binary star that is dimly visible to the naked eye as a point of light with an apparent visual magnitude of 5.91. It is being orbited by a brown dwarf. The system as a whole is located at a distance of approximately 84 light years from the Sun based on parallax measurements.

The discovery of this double star was announced by F. G. W. Struve in 1782, and later given the discovery code STF 1245. Their common proper motion was confirmed by A. van Maanen in 1916, and this suggested they are physically associated. Assuming they are gravitationally bound, they would have an orbital period of around 2,500 years.

(This object has the 2MASS designation J08354678+0635294.) Three additional faint companions detected by Struve are most likely background stars.

HD 72945
The binary nature of HD 72945 was announced in 1919 by A. H. Joy and G. Abetti at the Mount Wilson Observatory. Observed variations in the radial velocity of the primary component inferred an orbiting stellar companion. This is a single-lined spectroscopic binary system with a period of 14.3 days and an orbital eccentricity of 0.33. The minimum value for the semimajor axis is only 5.9 times the radius of the Sun, although the actual value is uncertain because the orbital inclination is unknown.

The visible component of this system has a stellar classification of F8 V, matching an ordinary F-type main-sequence star. It has 1.25 times the mass of the Sun and 1.4 times the Sun's radius. The star is radiating 2.4 times the luminosity of the Sun from its photosphere at an effective temperature of 6,222 K. It has an estimated age of approximately 1.6 billion years.

HD 72946
This is a G-type main-sequence star with a class of G5V. It has about the same size and mass as the Sun. However, the star is slightly more active than the Sun, and thus probably younger. It is metal-rich, showing a higher abundance of elements other than hydrogen and helium compared to the Sun.

In 2016, a candidate brown dwarf companion in orbit around HD 72946 was announced. It was discovered based on radial velocity monitoring over a twenty-year period. The companion was confirmed in 2020. It is orbiting with a period of 16 years and an eccentricity of 0.49.

References

F-type main-sequence stars
G-type main-sequence stars
Brown dwarfs
Spectroscopic binaries

Cancer (constellation)
3395
BD 07 1997
9271
072945
042172